The delicate slender opossum (Marmosops parvidens) is a small pouchless marsupial of the family Didelphidae that occurs in French Guiana, Guyana, Suriname, and adjacent Venezuela and Brazil. Marmosops pinheiroi, Marmosops bishopi and Marmosops juninensis had long been considered to represent the same species, until parvidens and pinheiroi were found in sympatry in French Guiana. This species is found in moist primary tropical rainforest at elevations up to 2000 m. It is nocturnal and partially arboreal, and feeds on insects and fruit.

References

External links 
 A list of various members of genus Marmosops.

Opossums
Marsupials of South America
Mammals of Brazil
Fauna of the Guianas
Mammals of French Guiana
Mammals of Guyana
Mammals of Suriname
Mammals of Venezuela
Mammals described in 1931